The 2015 Test Valley Borough Council election took place on 7 May 2015 to elect members of the Test Valley Borough Council in England. It was held on the same day as other local elections.

Results 

|-bgcolor=#F6F6F6
| colspan=2 style="text-align: right; margin-right: 1em" | Total
| style="text-align: right;" | 48
| colspan=5 |
| style="text-align: right;" | 34536
| style="text-align: right;" |
|-

Ward results

Abbey 
Note that in the previous election, Liberal Democrat candidate Sally Lamb stood as an Independent, receiving 27.20% of the vote share.

Alamein

Ampfield and Braishfield

Amport 
Note that Ben Few Brown had been the Conservative incumbent in the previous election

Anna

Blackwater

Bourne Valley

Broughton and Stockbridge

Charlton

Chilworth, Nursling and Rownhams

Cupernham

Dun Valley

Harewood

Harroway

Kings Somborne and Michelmersh

Millway

North Baddesley

Over Wallop

Penton Bellinger

Romsey Extra

St Mary's

Tadburn

Valley Park

Winton

References

2015 English local elections
May 2015 events in the United Kingdom
2015
2010s in Hampshire